The Getaway is an American travel documentary television series that aired on the Esquire Network and premiered on September 25, 2013. The Getaway was executive produced by Anthony Bourdain and followed celebrities as they have tours of their favorite or dream destinations for a quick trip.

Synopsis
The Getaway featured travel-loving celebrities, exploring and showcasing their favorite or dream vacation spots. The season premiere featured The Soup host Joel McHale in Belfast, United Kingdom. Other episodes had actor/comedian Aziz Ansari in Hong Kong; actress/comedian Aisha Tyler in Paris, France; rapper Eve in Kingston, Jamaica; and acclaimed chef José Andrés in San Juan, Puerto Rico.

Broadcast
It was set to premiere April 24, 2013, on but was pushed to September 25, 2013, the same week the network re-branding took place in order for Esquire Network to have a broader range of original programs aside from this series and Knife Fight. Season 2 premiered on October 15, 2014. 

Internationally, the series premiered in Australia on January 9, 2015 on Nat Geo People.

Series overview 
{| class="wikitable plainrowheaders" style="text-align: center;"
|-
! style="padding: 0px 8px;" colspan="2" rowspan="2"| Season
! style="padding: 0px 8px;" rowspan="2"| Episodes
! colspan="3" style="padding: 0px 8px;"| Originally aired
|-
! scope="col" style="padding: 0px 8px;"| Season premiere
! scope="col" style="padding: 0px 8px;"| Season finale
|-
 |style="background-color: #B30713;"|
 |1
 |10
 |
 |
|-
 |style="background-color: #0014a8;"|
 |2
 |9
 |
 |
|}

Episodes

Season 1

Season 2

References

External links

2010s American documentary television series
2013 American television series debuts
2014 American television series endings
English-language television shows